In Eastern Orthodox liturgy, the Apostolos is a book containing texts traditionally believed to be authored by one of the twelve apostles (disciples) – various epistles and the Acts of the Apostles – from which one is selected to be read during service. The Apostolos is the reading that precedes the Gospel Reading.

The term is also used for the reading of the selected text.

See also
Lectionary

References

Further reading

Eastern Orthodox liturgical books
Christian terminology